Synedrella is a genus of flowering plants in the family Asteraceae.

It contains only one known species,  Synedrella nodiflora, native to South America, Central America, Mexico, the West Indies, and Florida. It is naturalized in much of Asia, northern Australia, some Pacific Islands, and tropical Africa. Nodeweed and Cinderella weed are common names for this species.

Formerly included

Synedrella peduncularis Benth., syn of Schizoptera peduncularis (Benth.) S.F.Blake
Synedrella vialis (Less.) A.Gray, syn of Calyptocarpus vialis Less.

References

Monotypic Asteraceae genera
Heliantheae